Andrew "Andy" Burgess (born 1 April 1970) is a former professional rugby league footballer who played in the 1980s and 1990s. As of 2017, he coaches rugby union for Fylde R.U.F.C. (Under-15's) and from 2019-2020 season plays for Fylde Vandals

Background
Andy Burgess was born in Salford, Lancashire, England.

Playing career

International honours
Andy Burgess won 3 caps for Ireland in 1996–1998 while at Salford City Reds + 1-cap (sub).

County Cup Final appearances
Andy Burgess played  in Salford's 24–18 defeat by Widnes in the 1990 Lancashire County Cup Final during the 1990–91 season at Central Park, Wigan on Saturday 29 September 1990.

Club career
Burgess joined his hometown club Salford on his 17th birthday on 1 April 1987. He spent ten years at the club, appearing in 184 games.

References

1970 births
Living people
English rugby league players
Ireland national rugby league team players
People from Salford
Rochdale Hornets players
Rugby league locks
Rugby league players from Salford
Rugby league second-rows
Salford Red Devils players